David Cline may refer to:
 David Cline (activist), American anti-war and veterans rights activist
 David B. Cline, American particle physicist